A Man Called Dagger (1968) is a low-budget spy film that was the first collaboration between director Richard Rush, cinematographer László Kovács, and stuntman Gary Warner Kent (who also did the film's special effects).

It was filmed in 1966 by Lew Horwitz's Global Screen Associates (GSA) under the title Why Spy?  The film was originally intended to have been released by Mike Ripps' Cinema Distributors of America (CDA) in September 1966. When GSA and CDA's partnership collapsed, the film was picked up by MGM and released a year later.

Plot
Secret agents Dick Dagger and Harper Davis are on the trail of former SS Colonel Rudolph Koffman, who is using a meat-packing plant as his secret lair.

Ingrid is the wheelchair-using Koffman's mistress and runs a beauty spa. A massage therapist there, Joy, reveals to Dagger that another employee, Erica, is being held captive in Koffman's secret lair. Erica has been brainwashed and tries to kill Dagger, but does not succeed.

After the madman also kidnaps Harper, it is up to Dagger to stage a daring rescue operation. He is captured and tortured, but escapes thanks to a laser beam in his wristwatch. Koffman tries to kill him with a meat cleaver, but Dagger foils the villain and gets the women.

Cast
Paul Mantee as Dick Dagger
Jan Murray as Rudolph Koffman
Terry Moore as Harper Davis
Maureen Arthur as Joy
Richard Kiel as Otto
Eileen O'Neill as Erica
Sue Ane Langdon as Ingrid
Bruno VeSota as Dr. Grulik
Mimi Dillard as Melissa
Leonard Stone as Karl Rainer

Score
Steve Allen composed the film's score with Ronald Stein arranging and conducting it. Maureen Arthur sang Buddy Kaye's lyrics to Allen's title song.

Deleted scenes
Sue Ane Langdon recalled two scenes that did not make the final print.  One featured a West Highland White Terrier whose fur was dyed to match Langdon's hair in the film.  When she toured with the dog, people thought the fur colouring was hurting the dog.  As a result, the dog's scenes were cut.  She also recalled scenes of people hanging on meat hooks that were cut.

See also
List of American films of 1968

References

External links
 
 

1968 films
1960s spy films
1960s spy thriller films
American spy films
Metro-Goldwyn-Mayer films
Films directed by Richard Rush
Parody films based on James Bond films
1960s English-language films
1960s American films